is a railway station on the Joetsu Line in the city of Minamiuonuma, Niigata, Japan, operated by East Japan Railway Company (JR East).

Lines

Station layout
The station is unstaffed and consists of two elevated side platforms serving two tracks. The platforms are long enough to handle four-car trains. There is no access between the two platforms except via the road passing beneath the tracks. Simple prefab waiting rooms are provided at ground level on either side of the station, as there are no shelter facilities on the platforms.

Platforms

History
The station opened on 27 December 1997.

Surrounding area
 Joetsu International Ski Slope
 Hotel Green Plaza Joetsu

See also
 List of railway stations in Japan

References

External links

  

Railway stations in Niigata Prefecture
Railway stations in Japan opened in 1997
Stations of East Japan Railway Company
Jōetsu Line
Minamiuonuma